The CPR Angus Shops in Montreal were a railcar manufacturing, repairing and selling facility of the Canadian Pacific Railway. Production mainly consisted of passenger cars, freight cars and locomotives. Built in 1904 and named for  founder, Richard B. Angus, the Angus Shops were decommissioned in 1992. The underlying lands were subsequently redeveloped for commercial, industrial and housing usage. 

The  site had 66 buildings. More than 12,000 people worked there over the facility's lifetime.

Wartime manufactures
During World War II, Angus Shops produced Valentine tanks for the Russian Army under the Lend-Lease program. The first tank was completed on May 22, 1941, and production continued into 1943.

Redevelopment
The City of Montreal acquired the site and submitted the major part to private promoters' urban plan. Redevelopment began and consisted of several phases: building demolition, soil decontamination, and redefinition of the urban infrastructure of the Rosemont neighbourhood. Redevelopment took place between 1993 and 2000 at a cost of nearly $500 million.

Gallery

References

External links
 Colin Church, 1201 Goes to Angus



Rail infrastructure in Quebec
Transport in Montreal
Canadian Pacific Railway facilities
Rosemont–La Petite-Patrie